Shadirwan  may refer to:

Shadirvan, a fountain in a courtyard
Salsabil (fountain) a wall fountain with a large surface area
Band-e Kaisar, an ancient bridge in Iran